The Municipality of Podčetrtek ( or) is a municipality in the traditional region of Styria in eastern Slovenia. The seat of the municipality is the town of Podčetrtek. Podčetrtek became a municipality in 1995.

Settlements
In addition to the municipal seat of Podčetrtek, the municipality also includes the following settlements:

 Brezovec pri Polju
 Cmereška Gorca
 Golobinjek ob Sotli
 Gostinca
 Imeno
 Imenska Gorca
 Jerčin
 Lastnič
 Nezbiše
 Olimje
 Pecelj
 Polje ob Sotli
 Prelasko
 Pristava pri Lesičnem
 Pristava pri Mestinju
 Roginska Gorca
 Rudnica
 Sedlarjevo
 Sela
 Sodna Vas
 Sveta Ema
 Verače
 Vidovica
 Virštanj
 Vonarje

References

External links

Municipality of Podčetrtek on Geopedia
Podčetrtek municipal site

Podčetrtek
1995 establishments in Slovenia